Ego War is the debut album by British electronic duo Audio Bullys, released on 3 June 2003 by Source Records.

Promotion
"We Don't Care" was the first single to be released from the album. The promotional video for the song had gained much controversy as it shows a young boy going through his life like an abrupt teenager. "We Don't Care" is featured on the Teen Wolf soundtrack and series 3 of Fresh Meat.

Track listing

Sample credits
 "Way Too Long" samples "(I Don't Want to Go to) Chelsea" as performed by Elvis Costello and the Attractions and written by Costello.
 "Face in a Cloud" samples "Marjorine" as performed by Joe Cocker and written by Cocker and Chris Stainton.
 "We Don't Care" samples "Big Bad Wolf" as performed by Bunny & the Wolf Sisters and written by Douglas Brayfield.

References

2003 debut albums
Astralwerks albums
Audio Bullys albums